George Hammond may refer to:

George W. Hammond (1833–1908), American businessman
George Hammond (cricketer) (born 1976), South African cricketer
George Hammond (diplomat) (1763–1853), first British envoy to the United States
George Hammond (Stargate) (1942–2008), fictional character in the television series Stargate SG-1
George F. Hammond (1855–1938), American architect
George P. Hammond (1896–1993), American historian and Latin American scholar
George S. Hammond (1921–2005), American chemist
George Hammond (racing driver) (1902/3–?), American racing driver
George Hamond (1620–1705), also Hammond, English nonconformist minister

See also
Hammond (surname)